Kischinskinia is an extinct genus of passerine bird from late Miocene deposits of Russia. The type, and only species is Kischinskinia scandens.

References

Miocene birds
Certhioidea
Fossil taxa described in 2018